The One Jesselton Waterfront is a mixed development project comprising a shopping and entertainment centre, condominium and offices in Kota Kinabalu, Sabah, Malaysia. Together with the Jesselton Quay, Kota Kinabalu City Waterfront and Kota Kinabalu Convention City which is developed by other developers, it is part of waterfront revitalisation projects to transform Kota Kinabalu into a metropolitan city. Similar like the Jesselton Quay, the project total is around MYR1.8 billion. As 30th of September 2021, this project have been terminated by Gabungan AQRS due to the pandemic.

References 

Buildings and structures in Kota Kinabalu